Tubin may refer to:
 Eduard Tubin (1905 – 1982), Estonian composer
 Tubin, Iran, a village in East Azerbaijan Province, Iran